Jano Venter (born 8 January 1994) is a South African professional rugby union player for the  in Super Rugby and the  in the Rugby Challenge. His regular position is number eight.

Career

Youth / Pumas

At high school level, Venter was selected to represent the Pumas at the 2010 Under-16 Grant Khomo Week and again at the 2012 Under-18 Craven Week, the premier high school rugby union competition in South Africa. After the Craven Week, he was also selected to represent a South Africa Schools team that played in the 2012 Under-18 International Series held in the Western Cape against European opposition. He played in all three of South Africa's matches in the competition, starting their 17–7 victory over France and their 24–16 victory over Wales and came on as a second-half replacement in their 36–29 victory over England.

Golden Lions

The Golden Lions eventually lost the match 23–35 to finish as runners-up in the competition.

Venter moved up to the  age-group in 2014 and made five appearances for them in the 2014 Under-21 Provincial Championship.

He emulated that in their very next match, scoring two tries early in the match to beat the  36–20 in Welkom. The Golden Lions finished top of the Northern Section log to qualify for the play-off stage of the competition.

References

South African rugby union players
Living people
1994 births
People from Witbank
Rugby union number eights
Golden Lions players
Shimizu Koto Blue Sharks players
Rugby union players from Mpumalanga